Raymond Wilkins may refer to:
Ray Wilkins (1956–2018), English footballer
Ray Wilkins (footballer, born 1928) (1928–2018), English footballer
Ray Wilkins (Scary Movie), a character in Scary Movie and Scary Movie 2, portrayed by Shawn Wayans
Raymond H. Wilkins (1917–1943, US Air Force officer, posthumously awarded the Medal of Honor
Raymond Wilkins (actor), appeared in Veritas, Prince of Truth
Raymond Wilkins (rugby), Welsh rugby union and rugby league footballer